81 Ceti is a star located approximately 331 light years away from the Sun in the equatorial constellation of Cetus. 81 Ceti is the Flamsteed designation for this object. It is visible to the naked eye as a dim, yellow-hued point of light with an apparent visual magnitude of 5.65. The star is drifting further away from the Earth with a heliocentric radial velocity of +9 km/s.

This is an aging K-type giant star with a stellar classification of K0III, having exhausted the supply of hydrogen at its core and expanded to 11 times the Sun's radius. It is a red clump giant, which indicates it is on the horizontal branch and is generating energy from core helium fusion. The star is now 2.5 billion years old with 1.6 times the mass of the Sun. It is radiating  60 times the luminosity of the Sun from its enlarged photosphere at an effective temperature of 4,825 K.

Planetary system
In July 2008, the planet 81 Ceti b was announced by Sato and collaborators, along with 14 Andromedae b and 6 Lyncis b. The planet was found to be a super-Jupiter, with 5.3 times the mass of Jupiter. It takes 953 days for it to complete its orbit around the star.

See also
14 Andromedae
6 Lyncis
79 Ceti
94 Ceti
HD 167042
Lists of exoplanets

References

External links
 

K-type giants
Horizontal-branch stars
Planetary systems with one confirmed planet

Cetus (constellation)
Ceti, 81
Durchmusterung objects
016400
012247
0771